Toby Tse, also known as Tse Yee Lam (born 18 October 2004 in Hong Kong), is a Hong Kong professional squash player. As of July 2022, she was ranked number 170 in the world.

References

2004 births
Living people
Hong Kong female squash players